Xyrichtys victori, the Galapagos razorfish, is a species of marine ray-finned fish from the family Labridae, the wrasses. Found in the Eastern Pacific Ocean.  

Etymology
The fish is named in honor of Benjamin C. Victor, ichthyologist, CEO of Ocean Science Foundation. He co-discovered this species with Wellington in 1990.

References

victori
Fish described in 1992
Fish of the Pacific Ocean